Raheen-a-Cluig is a medieval church and National Monument in Bray, County Wicklow, Ireland.

Location

History

Raheen-a-Cluig is believed to have been built in the 12th–13th century AD. The name derives from the Irish Ráithín an Chloig. This would mean "little fort of the bell", but there is no sign of a fort. Ráithín can also refer to a wall of built-up sods of turf, or it could be a version of raithean, "ferny area". It was given to the Augustines by the then prominent Archbold family. It may have been dedicated to St Michael or St Brendan.

It was partially restored in the 18th century. Over the years it has also been used as a hideout by smugglers, and it associated with various ghost stories.

Church

The ruins have a doorway in the northeast wall which would have originally held a strong timber door, and round-headed windows in the east and west gables.

There were two smaller buildings close by and so is an enclosure: probably a cillín: a burial ground for suicides, shipwrecked sailors, strangers, unrepentant murderers and unbaptised babies.

About a 400 m (¼ mile) southeast of the church there was a holy well, known as Patrick’s Well. This was still used in the 1830s, mostly by invalids.

References

Churches in Bray, County Wicklow
Archaeological sites in County Wicklow
National Monuments in County Wicklow
Former churches in the Republic of Ireland